Herbert Stanley Woodhill (1875–1963) was an Australian rugby league footballer who played in New South Wales Rugby League (NSWRL) competition. He was a fullback, from the Paddington rugby juniors in the 1890s and was a first grade Rugby player for Eastern Suburbs in the 1900s before switching codes.

Woodhill  played for the Eastern Suburbs club in rugby league's founding season of 1908. After retiring from his playing career, he became a rugby league referee. He was also a veteran of the Boer War, serving with the N.S.W. Mounted Rifles between 1899 and 1902.

References

 

Australian rugby league players
Sydney Roosters players
1875 births
1963 deaths
Rugby league players from New South Wales